The 19th Artistic Gymnastics World Championships were held in Strasbourg, France, in 1978 from October 23 to October 29.

This was the first world championships to make use of video replays. A video control system was installed near each apparatus to help judges in disputable situations. The system had first been used at the 1977 European Championships.

For the first time eight gymnasts were allowed to qualify to each of the apparatus finals, rather than six. This became the standard going forward.

Results

NB: Team rosters are incomplete.

Kurt Thomas and Marica Frederick's gold medals were the first at world championship level for the American men and women.

Men

Team final

All-around

Floor exercise

Pommel horse

Rings

Vault

Parallel bars

Horizontal bar

Women

Team final

All-around

Vault

Uneven bars

Balance beam

Floor exercise

Medals

References 

World Artistic Gymnastics Championships
1978 in gymnastics
1978 in French sport
International gymnastics competitions hosted by France